Stories & Songs is the third album released by Contemporary Christian artist Mark Schultz. It was released on October 14, 2003.

Track listing 
All songs written by Mark Schultz, except where noted.
 "You Are a Child of Mine" (Schultz, Chris Eaton) - 4:56
 "Everywhere" (Schultz, Brown Bannister) - 3:11
 "Letters From War" (Schultz, Cindy Morgan) - 4:15
 "Do You Even Know Me Anymore" - 4:09
 "Time That Is Left" - 3:56
 "Running Just to Catch Myself" - 5:17
 "It's Been a Long Time" - 4:27
 "He Will Carry Me" (Schultz, Dennis Kurttila, Sampson Brueher) - 4:32
 "Just to Know You" - 4:14
 "Closer to You" - 4:48
 "Time That Is Left (Reprised)" - 2:29

Personnel
 Mark Schultz – lead and backing vocals, whistle (6)
 Shane Keister – piano
 Matt Rollings – piano
 Blair Masters – keyboards 
 Jeff Roach – keyboards
 Gordon Kennedy – electric guitar, guitar 
 Jerry McPherson – acoustic guitar, electric guitar, guitar 
 Bryan Sutton – acoustic guitar
 Tom Hemby – bouzouki, mandolin 
 Mark Hill – bass
 Jimmie Lee Sloas – bass
 Steve Brewster – drums
 Dan Needham – drums
 Eric Darken – percussion 
 John Catchings – cello
 Carl Marsh – orchestral and horn arrangements, conductor 
 The London Session Orchestra – strings, horns
 Gavyn Wright – concertmaster 
 Gene Miller – backing vocals 
 Ellie Holcomb – backing vocals (5)
 Tim Davis – backing vocals (6)

Production
 Producer – Brown Bannister 
 A&R – Burton Brooks and Shawn McSpadden
 Engineers  – Steve Bishir and Danny Duncan
 Assistant Engineer and Digital Editing – Hank Nirider
 Mixing – Steve Bishir
 Mastered by Stephen Marcussen at Marcussen Mastering (Hollywood, CA).
 Production Coordination – Traci Sterling Bishir, assisted by Miche Bentrem.
 Creative Direction – Tammie Harris Cleek and Katherine Petillo
 Art Direction – Katherine Petillo
 Design and Layout – Wayne Brezinka
 Photography – Michael Gomez and Michael Wilson
 Stylist – Claudia Fowler
 Hair and Makeup – Robin Geary and Lori Turk

Singles

Mark Schultz (musician) albums
2003 albums